Dennis Nolan may refer to:
Dennis Nolan (politician) (born 1961), Republican member of the Nevada Senate
Dennis E. Nolan (1872–1956), United States Army general